Bocula tuhanensis is a moth of the family Erebidae first described by Jeremy Daniel Holloway in 1976. It is found in Borneo.

References

Rivulinae